Clover is a brand of soft spread sold in the United Kingdom that is produced by Saputo Dairy UK. It resembles butter but is easier to spread when cold. Its ingredients include vegetable fat and buttermilk. The brand was launched in September 1983 and is claimed to be worth £81m at retail value. It is made in Kirkby near Liverpool, Merseyside.

Clover was created as a way of adding value to surplus milk by the struggling dairy industry. Clover was originally produced in the now-derelict Great Torrington Creamery.

See also
 Utterly Butterly, another spread brand by Saputo.

References

Margarine brands
Products introduced in 1983
Spreads (food)